Shivam Malhotra (born 7 March 1991) is an Indian cricketer. He made his List A debut for Mumbai in the 2016–17 Vijay Hazare Trophy on 25 February 2017. He made his first-class debut for Mumbai in the 2017–18 Ranji Trophy on 7 December 2017.

References

External links
 

1991 births
Living people
Indian cricketers
Mumbai cricketers
Place of birth missing (living people)